The 2019 Football Championship of Kherson Oblast was won by FC Tavriya Novotroitske.

League table

 FC Tavria Novotroitske and SC Kakhovka played in the 2018–19 Ukrainian Football Amateur League and the 2019–20 Ukrainian Football Amateur League.

References

Football
Kherson
Kherson